M-1975 may refer to:

 2S4 Tyulpan, a Soviet self-propelled 240mm mortar
 2S7 Pion, a Soviet self-propelled 203mm gun
 M-1975, a North Korean self-propelled 130mm gun (Type 59-1) gun on a locally built chassis

See also
 Model 1875 (disambiguation) -- M-1875
 M75 (disambiguation)
 1975 (disambiguation)